Thomas Parke may refer to:

 Thomas Parke (physician) (1749-1783), American physician
Thomas Parke (architect) (1793–1864), architect, builder, journalist and political figure in Upper Canada
 Thomas Parke (merchant) (1729–1819), Liverpool merchant, banker and privateer
 Thomas Parke (Royal Marines officer) (1780–1858), officer in the Royal Marines
 Thomas Heazle Parke (1857–1893), Irish doctor, explorer, soldier and naturalist